Trichromia eximius is a moth in the family Erebidae. It was described by Walter Rothschild in 1910. It is found in Peru.

References

Moths described in 1910
eximius